Rahama railway station is a railway station on the East Coast Railway network in the state of Odisha, India. It serves Rahama village. Its code is RHMA. It has two platforms. Passenger, MEMU, Express trains halt at Rahama railway station.

Major trains
 Santragachi–Paradeep Express
 Paradeep−Puri Intercity Express
 Paradeep–Visakhapatnam Express

See also
 Jagatsinghpur district

References

Railway stations in Jagatsinghpur district
Khurda Road railway division